St. Ann's Episcopal Church or St. Anne's Episcopal Church may refer to:
(listed by state, then city/town)

St. Anne's Episcopal Church (Middletown, Delaware)
St. Anne's Episcopal Church (Anna, Illinois), listed on the National Register of Historic Places (NRHP)
St. Anne's Episcopal Church (Calais, Maine), NRHP-listed
St. Anne's Church (Annapolis, Maryland), NRHP-listed
St. Ann's Episcopal Church (Bronx), New York
St. Ann & the Holy Trinity Church, Brooklyn, New York
Saint Ann's School (Brooklyn), New York
St. Ann's Episcopal Church (Sayville, New York), listed on the NRHP in Suffolk County, New York
St. Ann's Episcopal Church (Nashville, Tennessee), NRHP-listed
St. Ann's Episcopal Church (Richford, Vermont), NRHP-listed

See also
 St. Anne's Church (disambiguation), including several name variations